Bia is an Argentine televisión series original of Disney Channel Latin America produced by Pegsa and Non Stop and Disney Channel Latin America in collaboration with Disney Channel Europe, Middle East & Africa (EMEA). Bia is the third original production of Disney Channel Latin America after Violetta and  Soy Luna. The series directed by Jorge Bechara and Daniel De Filippo, stars Isabela Souza along with Julio Peña Fernández, Gabriella Di Grecco, Fernando Dente, Agustina Palma, Giulia Guerrini, Andrea De Alba and Guido Messina, as well as Daniela Trujillo, Micaela Díaz, Julia Argüelles, Alan Madanes, Rhener Freitas, Esteban Velásquez, Rodrigo Rumi, Luis Giraldo, Valentina González and Jandino.

Its first season of 60 episodes premiered on 24 June 2019, and concluded on 8 November 2019. In October 2019, it was announced that the series was renewed for a second season, which premiered on 16 March 2020 and concluded on 24 July 2020 after 60 episodes.

In November 2020, a special episode titled Bia: Un mundo al revés (Bia: An Upside Down World) was officially announced. It was released exclusively on Disney+ on 19 February 2021.
The show will not be returning for a third season.

Plot 
The plot focuses on the 16 year old Beatriz Urquiza (Isabela Souza), a girl who likes to draw. When Beatriz "Bia" was very young, she loved making music with her older sister Helena (Gabriella Di Grecco). Helena was herself a singer and a member of the band MoonDust, which included her boyfriend Víctor (Fernando Dente) and his little brother Lucas Gutiérrez. One day the band got into a traffic accident in which Lucas and apparently Helena died and only Víctor survived, who is now paraplegic and has to sit in a wheelchair. Bia still suffers from the loss of her sister ten years later, and neither have the Urquiza or Gutiérrez families processed the loss of their children or siblings. There has been hostility between the two families since the accident, particularly the Gutiérrez make life difficult for the Urquiza because they make Helena responsible for the accident.

The situation escalates when Bía and Manuel (Julio Peña Fernández) fall in love because Manuel is the cousin of Víctor and Alex Gutiérrez. While their love meets with little approval within their families, they both try to make the best of the situation and fight for their love. But among other things, Alex does everything to separate the two and makes life hell for them. The two find support from their friends and from Víctor, who best copes with Manuel from his family, and vice versa. In addition, a mysterious young woman named Ana appears in the Residence Kunst, who has a connection to what has happened in the past. And after a short time it turns out that there are some secrets and intrigues in the Gutiérrez family that reveal terrible deeds.

Cast and characters

Main 

 Isabela Souza as Beatriz "Bia" Urquiza.
 Julio Peña Fernández as Manuel Gutiérrez Quemola.
 Gabriella Di Grecco as Ana Da Silvo / Helena Urquiza.
 Fernando Dente as Víctor Gutiérrez.
 Agustina Palma as Celeste Quinterro.
 Giulia Guerrini as Chiara Callegri.
 Andrea de Alba as Carmín Laguardia.
 Guido Messina as Alex Gutiérrez.
 Daniela Trujillo as Isabel "Pixie" Ocaranta.
 Micaela Diaz as Daisy Durant.
 Julia Argüelles as Mara Morales.
 Alan Madanes as Pietro Benedetto Junior.
 Rhener Freitas as Thiago Kunst.
 Esteban Velásquez as Guillermo Ruiz.
 Rodrigo Rumi as Marcos Golden.
 Luis Giraldo as Jhon Caballero (season 1).
 Valentina González as Aillén.
 Jandino as himself.
 Sergio Surraco as Antonio Gutiérrez.
 Estela Ribeiro as Alice Urquiza.
 Alejandro Botto as Mariano Urquiza.
 Mariela Pizzo as Paula Gutiérrez.
 André Lamoglia as Luan (season 2).

Recurring 

 Florencia Tassara as Beatriz "Bia" Urquiza (child).
 Nicolás Domini as Lucas Gutiérrez.
 Sebastián Sinnott as Charly.
 Santiago Sapag as Milo.
 Simón Tobías as Hugo Landa "Indy House".
 Katja Martínez as Jazmín Carbajal (from Soy Luna, season 1).
 Mirela Payret as Lucía Quemola.
 Facundo Gambandé as Marcelo.
 Camila Vaccarini as Valeria.
 Ana Wasbein as Julia (season 1).
 Ana Carolina Valsagna as Florencia (season 1).
 Mariano Muente as Claudio Gutiérrez (season 1).
 Jimena González as Antonia Svetonia (season 1).
 Sebastián Holz as Silvio (season 1).
 Daniela Améndola as Chloe (season 1).
 Lourdes Mancilla as Camila (season 1).
 Nicole Luis as Soledad.
 Mariana Redi as Luciana.
 Neira Mariel as Uma.
 Ximena Palomino as Olivia (season 1).
 Malena Ratner as Delfina "Delfi" Alzamendi (from Soy Luna, season 2).
 Maximiliano Sarramone as Juan (season 2).
 Alfonso Burgos as Julián (season 2).
 Macarena Suárez as Trish (season 2).
 Hylka Maria as Alana (season 2).
 Felipe González Otaño as Zeta Benedetto (season 2).
 Leo Trento as Carlos Benedetto / Pietro Benedetto Mr. (season 2).
 Robbie Newborn as Ruben (season 2).
 Julia Zenko as a fortune teller (season 2).

Guest stars 

 Sebastián Villalobos as himself.
 Kevsho as himself.
 Facundo Rodríguez Casal as himself.
 Connie Isla as herself (season 1).
 Gian Pablo "Giian Pa" as himself (season 1).
 Mario Ruiz as himself (season 1).
 Daniela Calle and María José Garzón "Poché" as themselves.
 Clara Marz as herself (season 2).
 Agustín Bernasconi and Maxi Espindola "MYA" as themselves (season 2).
 Paula Etxeberria and Aitana Etxeberria "Twin Melody" as themselves (season 2).
 Pautips as herself (season 2).

Awards and nominations

Episodes

Music 
Walt Disney Records has released three soundtrack albums containing the music from Seasons 1 and 2.

Distribution 
In the United States, the show was made available on Disney+ on November 20, 2020, with English subtitles.

References

Notes

External links 
 

Disney Channel telenovelas
Argentine telenovelas
Children's telenovelas
Disney Channel (Latin American TV channel) original programming
Spanish-language Disney Channel original programming
2019 Argentine television series debuts
2019 telenovelas
2020 telenovelas
Television series about teenagers